The 2002 Magog municipal election was held on December 1, 2002, to elect a mayor and councillors in the city of Magog, Quebec. This was the city's first election following an amalgamation with two neighbouring townships.

Results

Sources: Nelson Afonso, "Poulin elected to lead new city of Magog," 2 December 2002, p. 1.

References

Magog municipal election
Magog, Quebec